This is a list of airports in Luxembourg, sorted by location.

List

See also 
 Transport in Luxembourg
 List of airports by ICAO code: E#EL – Luxembourg
 Wikipedia: Airline destination lists: Europe#Luxembourg

References

External links

 
Luxembourg
Airports
Luxembourg
Airports